Kenn Lim (born 20 May 1986) is a Malaysian badminton player. He was part of the Malaysian junior team that won the bronze medal at the 2004 Asian Junior Championships in the boys' team event. He was the champion at the 2006 Sri Lanka Satellite and 2010 Portugal International tournament in the men's singles event. Lim who was educated at the Leeds Metropolitan University was the 2008 runner-up and 2009 champion at the BUCS Badminton Championships, and also won the 2008 Wimbledon National Elite Open. Lim represented Yorkshire at the Badminton England circuit, and clinched the men's singles title at the Northumberland Championships.

Achievements

BWF International Challenge/Series
Men's singles

 BWF International Challenge tournament
 BWF International Series tournament

References

External links
 

1986 births
Living people
People from Alor Setar
Malaysian sportspeople of Chinese descent
Malaysian male badminton players
21st-century Malaysian people